The National Weather Service Tampa, Florida is a local office of the National Weather Service responsible for monitoring weather conditions in west-central Florida, United States. The office is located in Ruskin, and currently has 26 employees.

External links
 NWS Tampa's website

Tampa, Florida
Organizations based in Tampa, Florida
Climate of Florida